Mahmoud Sadeghi is an Iranian lawyer, jurist, academic and reformist politician who was a member of the Parliament of Iran representing Tehran, Rey, Shemiranat and Eslamshahr electoral district from May 2016 to May 2020.

On 25 February 2020, during the COVID-19 pandemic, Sadeghi tested positive for SARS-CoV-2, the virus that causes coronavirus disease 2019.

Early life
Sadeqi was born in Aligoudarz in 1962 to a clerical family. His father, Mohammad Hossein Sadeghi, was one of the many clerics opposed to the Pahlavi dynasty, and was a student of Ayatollah Khomeini. After the revolution, Mohammad Hossein Sadeghi was killed in the Hafte Tir bombing.

Education 
Sadeqi received his bachelor's degree in law from the University of Tehran in 1990. He received his Masters in private law from Tarbiat Modares University in 1993, and received his Doctorate in private law from the same university in 2000.

Career 
Sadeqi is an associate professor at the Tarbiat Modares University and his field of expertise is Private law.

Electoral history

Personal life
On 25 February 2020, after the COVID-19 pandemic became known to have spread to Iran, Sadeqi stated that he had been infected with SARS-CoV-2, the virus that causes coronavirus disease 2019.

References

Living people
20th-century Iranian lawyers
21st-century Iranian lawyers
Iranian reformists
Members of the 10th Islamic Consultative Assembly
1962 births
University of Tehran alumni
Tarbiat Modares University alumni
Academic staff of Tarbiat Modares University
Islamic Association of University Instructors politicians
Secretaries-General of political parties in Iran
Rotating Presidents of the Council for Coordinating the Reforms Front
Volunteer Basij personnel of the Iran–Iraq War
Islamic Republican Party politicians